Akerøya is an uninhabited island in the Hvaler island chain in Østfold, Norway. The island has an area of 1.6 km². On the islet Festningholmen near Akerøya is Akerøya Fort which from the 17th century was part of the fortifications of Fredrikstad Fortress.
 Akerøya was protected as a nature reserve from 1978, and is included in the Ytre Hvaler National Park from 2009.

References

Hvaler
Uninhabited islands of Norway
Islands of Viken (county)